Latgale Region, officially Latgale Planning Region is one of the five planning regions of Latvia, it is situated in the estern part of Latvia. The state institution was founded on 2 October 2006, based on the creation of the region territory as prescribed by Regulations No. 133 of the Cabinet of Ministers as of 25 March 2003, the "Regulations on Territories of Planning Regions". As of 2020, the region's population was 281,116.

Geography 
The territory of the Latgale Region was created in 2006.

Demography 
Latgale Region had a population of 247,220 inhabitants in 2022.

See also 
Planning regions of Latvia
Administrative divisions of Latvia

References

External links 
Latgale planning region 

Subdivisions of Latvia
States and territories established in 2006
2006 establishments in Latvia